The Hanthel Mosque is a mosque in Sana'a, Yemen. It lies to the west of Al-Tahrir Square, near the offices of the Ministry of Civil Services and north of the Egyptian Embassy.

See also
 Islam in Yemen
 List of mosques in Yemen

References

Mosques in Sanaa